Dmitriy Furmanov class is a class of Russian river passenger ships, project 302, 302M, 302MK / German name BiFa129M.

The class is named after the first ship in the class Dmitriy Furmanov, which in her turn was named after Dmitry Furmanov.

Four-deck cruise ships manufactured in Boizenburg, Germany, 1983–1992.

River cruise ships of the German project 302, 302M, 302MK / BiFa129M

Overview

See also
 List of river cruise ships
 Valerian Kuybyshev-class motorship
 Rossiya-class motorship (1952)
 Rossiya-class motorship (1973)
 Anton Chekhov-class motorship
 Vladimir Ilyich-class motorship
 Rodina-class motorship
 Baykal-class motorship
 Sergey Yesenin-class motorship
 Oktyabrskaya Revolyutsiya-class motorship
 Yerofey Khabarov-class motorship
 Dunay-class motorship
 Volga-class motorship

References

River cruise ships
Ships of Russia
Passenger ships of the Soviet Union
East Germany–Soviet Union relations
Ships built in East Germany